Fran Gebhard is a Canadian actress and theatre director. She is most noted for her performance in the 1987 film Blue City Slammers, for which she received a Genie Award nomination for Best Supporting Actress at the 9th Genie Awards. She is currently a professor at the University of Victoria.

Career 
Gebhard has had supporting or guest roles in the films A Piano for Mrs. Cimino, Police Academy 3: Back in Training, Love and Murder, Ernest Goes to School and Case 39, and the television series Check It Out!, Friday the 13th: The Series, T. and T., The Dead Zone, The Chris Isaak Show and The L Word. As a director, her work has included productions of You're a Good Man, Charlie Brown, Wreckage, The School for Scandal, Crackpot, The Affections of May, Twelfth Night, For the Pleasure of Seeing Her Again and A Midsummer Night's Dream.

She has also been associated with the Banff Centre for Arts and Creativity, including as program head of the Playwrights' Colony and coordinator of the Screenwriters' Workshop. 

Gebhard has often served as a festival adjudicator for Theatre BC's regional zone festivals. Gebhard adjudicated the 2014 North Island Zone Drama Festival. In 2015, she was the Main Stage Adjudicator for Kamloops. Gebhard adjudicated the Fraser Valley Zone Festival in 2017. In 2018, she adjudicated the Kitimat Drama Festival. She served as the Main Stage Adjudicator in Vernon in 2022.

A theatre professor at the University of Victoria, Gebhard has directed productions for the university's Phoenix Theatre. In 2016, she directed Les Liaisons Dangereuses. She directed Morris Panych's 7 Stories in 2019. In 2021, Gebhard directed George F. Walker's Problem Child and Sarah Ruhl's Dead Man's Cell Phone.

Gebhard has also directed several productions for Victoria's Blue Bridge Repertory Theatre including The Importance of Being Earnest (2016), Barefoot in the Park (2019), and Salt Water Moon (2021)

Filmography

Film

Television

References

External links

20th-century Canadian actresses
21st-century Canadian actresses
Canadian film actresses
Canadian stage actresses
Canadian television actresses
Canadian theatre directors
Academic staff of the University of Victoria
Living people
Year of birth missing (living people)
University of British Columbia alumni